Pierre Petit (21 April 1922 – 1 July 2000) was a French composer.

Life
Petit was born in Poitiers, the son of a professor of the khâgne. He studied literature and music in Paris (Hattemer Course, Lycée Louis-le-Grand) and literature at the Sorbonne. He studied at the Paris Conservatoire from 1942, his teachers included Georges Dandelot for music analysis, Nadia Boulanger for harmony, Noël Gallon for counterpoint and fugue, and Henri Busser for composition.

In 1946, he won the Premier Grand Prix de Rome with the lyrical scene Le jeu de l'amour et du hasard, which was performed in the same year by the orchestra of the Cadets du Conservatoire under the direction of Claude Delvincourt.

From 1951 Petit taught the history of civilization at the Conservatoire de Paris and the École polytechnique. In 1960, he began working for the Office de Radiodiffusion Télévision Française. At first he was head of light music, and then from 1965 he was musical director. Among others, he produced music for accords parfaits, contre-ut, Presto, Figaro ci figaro là.

In 1963, he was appointed director of the École normale de musique de Paris, succeeding Alfred Cortot and working alongside such musicians as Nadia Boulanger, Georges Dandelot, Alfred Desenclos, Norbert Dufourcq and Marguerite Roesgen-Champion. He held the position for 35 years, when he was succeeded by Henri Heugel. His students included Roger Bellon.

He was also on the jury of the Long-Thibaud-Crespin Competition.

Output and awards
Petit composed operas, operettas and ballets, orchestral works, concertos, chamber music and songs. He was also noted as a music writer, writing books on Verdi, Ravel, Mozart, and a study of the musical problems of Aristotle. He was also a music critic for Le Figaro.

For his musical work, in 1965 he was awarded the Grand Prix du Conseil Général de la Seine, and in 1985, the Grand Music Prize of SACEM.

Personal life
He married the singer Christiane Castelli, famous for her interpretation of Tosca at the Opéra de Paris. They had three children, Claude (journalist and writer), Didier (singer, songwriter and performer under the name Romain Didier) and Marie-Laurène. Later he married the violinist Marie-Claude Theuveny in 1958, and had two children with her, Carolin Petit, composer and arranger of music for film and television, and Nicolas. Finally, in 1974 he married his third wife Liliane Fiaux.

Works

Compositions
 Mélodie for voice and piano, 1941
 6 Petites pièces à 4 mains, piano pieces for children, 1942
 Concertino pour piano, 1942
 Suite für vier Celli, 1942
 Bois de Boulogne, five pieces for piano, 1946
 La Maréchale Sans-Gêne, operetta, 1948
 Zadig, ballet, 1948
 Deux mélodies sur des poèmes de Charles Oulmont, 1949
 Romanza romana, 1950
 Ciné-Bijou, ballet after jazz themes, composed for Roland Petit, 1952
 Feu rouge, feu vert, ballet, 1953
 Saxopéra, for saxophone, 1955
 Furia italiana, opera, 1958
 Concertino for organ, strings and percussion, 1958
 Concerto pour tête-à-tête, opera, 1959
 Migraine, comic opera, 1959
 Toccata et Tarentelle for two guitars, 1959
 Andante und Fileuse for saxophone, 1959
 Concerto for two guitars, 1964
 Quatre poèmes de Paul Gilson, 1965
 Le Diable à deux for two pianos, 1970
 Tarentelle for orchestra, 1971
 Suite for two cellos and orchestra, 1974
 Orphée, ballet, 1975
 Oregon, piano suite for children, 1979
 Mouvement perpétuel for guitar, 1984

Writings
 Autour de la chanson française, 1952
 Verdi, 1958
 Ravel, 1970
 Mozart, 1991

References
 "Pierre Petit", in Sax, Mule & Co, Jean-Pierre Thiollet, H & D, Paris, 2004, s. 160-161
 Pierre Petit in the Encyclopédie Universalis

External links
 

20th-century French composers
French operetta composers
People from Poitiers
1922 births
2000 deaths
20th-century classical composers
Conservatoire de Paris alumni
École Normale de Musique de Paris alumni
Academic staff of the École Normale de Musique de Paris
Composers for the classical guitar
Prix de Rome for composition
French music critics